Dead Horse Peak is a  mountain summit located on the common border that Duchesne County shares with Summit County in the U.S. state of Utah.

Description
Dead Horse Peak is set within the High Uintas Wilderness on land managed by Ashley National Forest and Uinta-Wasatch-Cache National Forest. It is situated along the crest of the Uinta Mountains which are a subset of the Rocky Mountains, and it ranks as the 50th-highest summit in Utah. Neighbors include Explorer Peak three miles to the southeast, Mount Beulah 3.5 miles north, and line parent Yard Peak is 1.5 mile northwest. Precipitation runoff from this mountain drains north to the Blacks Fork and south into headwaters of Rock Creek which is a tributary of the Duchesne River.

Etymology

This mountain's toponym has not been officially adopted by the United States Board on Geographic Names, so it is not labelled on USGS maps, and will remain unofficial as long as the USGS policy of not adopting new toponyms in designated wilderness areas remains in effect. The peak is named in association with Dead Horse Lake and Dead Horse Pass which are both one mile east of the peak, and are both officially named.

Climate
Based on the Köppen climate classification, Dead Horse Peak is located in a subarctic climate zone with cold snowy winters and mild summers. Tundra climate characterizes the summit and highest slopes.

Gallery

See also
 Geology of the Uinta Mountains

References

External links
 Utah's Highest Peaks, peakbagger.com

Mountains of Utah
Features of the Uinta Mountains
Mountains of Duchesne County, Utah
Mountains of Summit County, Utah
North American 3000 m summits
Ashley National Forest
Wasatch-Cache National Forest